Life Is a Many Splendored Gig is an album by the Herb Pomeroy Orchestra.

Recording and music
The album was recorded in New York in June 1957. The arrangements were written by various band members.

Release
The album was released by Roulette Records in 1957 or early 1958. It was issued on CD by Fresh Sound Records more than four decades later.

Reception
The Penguin Guide to Jazz commented that "for admirers of sophisticated big-band music it's an unexpected delight".

Track listing
"Blue Grass"
"Wolafunt's Lament"
"Jack Sprat"
"Aluminum Baby"
"It's Sandman"
"Our Delight"
"Theme for Terry"
"No One Will Room with Me"
"Feather Merchant"
"Big Man"
"Less Talk"

Personnel
Herb Pomeroy – trumpet
Lennie Johnson – trumpet
Augie Ferretti – trumpet
Everett Longstreth – trumpet
Joe Gordon – trumpet
Joe Ciavardone – trombone
Bill Legan – trombone
Gene DiStasio – trombone
Deane Haskins – baritone sax
Varty Haroutunian – tenor sax
Jaki Byard – tenor sax
Zoot Sims (uncredited) – tenor sax
Dave Chapman – alto sax
Boots Mussulli – alto sax
Ray Santisi – piano
John Neves – bass
Jimmy Zitano – drums

References

1957 albums
Roulette Records albums